Arthur Romney Green (16 February 1872 – 21 February 1945) was an English craftsman and furniture designer, based in Christchurch, Hampshire. His furniture carries influence of the Arts and Crafts style, popularized by William Morris in the 1880s. Some examples of Romney Green's furniture are exhibited in Christchurch Priory, All Saints Church in Catherington, Hampshire, and the Victoria and Albert Museum in Brompton, London. He was the elder brother of the English architect William Curtis Green.

Early life
Green was born in Alton, Hampshire. He was the eldest son born to Frederick Green, a barrister, and his wife Maria  Heath Curtis. His younger brother was the English architect William Curtis Green.

Career
Green initially taught mathematics at Cambridge but left to concentrate on furniture design and woodwork and set up business in Christchurch, Dorset. His work, according to the architect Hubert Worthington, "combines underlying geometric principles with the traditional practices associated with the work of Ernest Gimson and the Barnsley brothers, but he was also indebted to Georgian prototypes." Romney Green was the author of Woodwork in Principle and Practice in 1918. He used locally sourced timber which he sold direct to the customer, rather than through retailers.

Green believed that small scale workshops would help solve the problems of unemployment. During the 1930s he supervised workshops for the unemployed under the auspices of the Rural Industries Bureau, and during the war years, employed invalided ex-soldiers and taught them woodworking skills. He offered apprenticeships, many of whom went on to set up as master craftsmen in their own right. He offered 
placements to boys who were experiencing educational difficulties which allowed them to learn a trade and increase their self-esteem, and literacy skills.

Green held essay readings and discussions at his home, which were attended by Eric Gill and Bertrand Russell. He also lectured at Christchurch Adult School, on such topics as the poetry of William Morris.

Personal life
Green was married twice; he left his first wife, Florence, and started a relationship with Bertha Murray whom he married in 1928. He died of a cerebral haemorrhage aged 73 on 5 February 1945, having been involved in cycling accident in Christchurch, Dorset. He was buried in Christchurch Cemetery on 24 February 1945, along with his wife, Bertha, who had predeceased him by three years.

Legacy
Green's furniture designs carry influence of the Arts and Crafts style. Some examples of his furniture are exhibited in Christchurch Priory, All Saints Church in Catherington, Hampshire, and the Victoria & Albert Museum, London.

References

Further reading 

1872 births
1945 deaths
English furniture designers
British woodworkers
People of the Victorian era
People from Alton, Hampshire